Theresa Saldana (August 20, 1954 – June 6, 2016) was an American actress, activist, and writer. She is known for her role as Rachel Scali, the wife of Police Commissioner Tony Scali, in the 1990s television series The Commish, for which she received a Golden Globe nomination for Best Performance by an Actress in a Supporting Role, in 1994. Major film roles include Lenora LaMotta, the wife of Joe Pesci's character in the 1980 film,  Raging Bull, and as a Beatles fan in Robert Zemeckis' 1978 Beatlemania ensemble I Wanna Hold Your Hand. She was also known for raising public awareness of the crime of stalking after surviving a knife attack by an obsessed fan at her home in 1982.

Early life
Saldana was born in the Brooklyn borough of New York City, and was adopted at five days old by Divina and Tony Saldana, a family of Puerto Rican and Italian-American heritage.

Saldana took dance lessons as a child. After suffering a serious shoulder injury while part of a tumbling team, she enrolled in acting classes at age 12. After being spotted by a talent scout while performing in an Off Broadway musical called The New York City Street Show in 1977, she was cast in the 1978 film Nunzio.

Stalking incident
On March 15, 1982, Saldana was stalked by Arthur Richard Jackson, a 46-year-old drifter from Aberdeen, Scotland. Jackson became obsessed with Saldana after seeing her in the 1980 films Defiance and Raging Bull. He hired a private investigator who obtained the unlisted phone number of Saldana's mother. Jackson then called Saldana's mother and posed as Martin Scorsese's assistant, saying he needed Saldana's residential address in order to contact her for replacing an actress in a film role in Europe.

Jackson approached Saldana in front of her West Hollywood residence in broad daylight on March 15, 1982 and attacked her with a 5½-inch (14 cm) hunting knife, puncturing a lung. His attack was so fierce that the blade bent. Although there were many nearby onlookers including children, the attack was interrupted only when a deliveryman, Jeff Fenn, intervened after hearing her cries, rushed from the second floor of an apartment building, and incapacitated Jackson. Following the assault, Saldana was hospitalized with 10 stab wounds and underwent a four-month hospital stay at the Motion Picture Hospital. She relived the incident in the made-for-TV movie Victims for Victims: The Theresa Saldana Story and again in an episode of Hunter.

Jackson served almost 14 years in prison for the assault and making subsequent threats against Saldana and her rescuer while in prison. He was then extradited to the United Kingdom in 1996 to be tried for a 1966 robbery and murder. Jackson (who once saw himself as "the benevolent angel of death") was found not guilty by diminished responsibility in 1997 and committed to a British psychiatric hospital, where he died of heart failure in 2004, at the age of 68.

Jackson's method of finding and approaching Saldana inspired stalker Robert John Bardo to hire a private investigator to contact Rebecca Schaeffer, a young TV sitcom star whom he subsequently murdered, also in West Hollywood, on July 18, 1989.

Victim advocacy
Following her long recovery, Saldana founded the Victims for Victims organization and participated in lobbying for the 1990 anti-stalking law and the 1994 Driver's Privacy Protection Act, both of which came into being partly as a consequence of the attack. The experience also inspired Saldana to play herself in the television movie Victims for Victims: The Theresa Saldana Story, and she authored the book Beyond Survival, a memoir of her experiences after being attacked.

Personal life
Saldana's first marriage was to Fred Feliciano from February 11, 1979 to 1986. In March 1989, she married for the second time, to Phil Peters, with whom she had a daughter, Tianna Saldana Peters (born August 30, 1989, in Los Angeles). They remained together until her death.

Death
Saldana died at age 61 on June 6, 2016, following her hospitalization for pneumonia at Cedars-Sinai Medical Center. Michael Chiklis, who played Saldana's husband on The Commish, wrote that it was "painful to hear the news."

Filmography

Film

Television

Books

References

External links

 
 
 Interview on CNN Larry King Live with Saldana and Fenn on July 13, 2004.
 The Jazz Tap Ensemble
 Theresa Saldana(Aveleyman)

1954 births
2016 deaths
20th-century American actresses
21st-century American actresses
Activists from New York City
Actresses from New York City
American adoptees
American film actresses
American television actresses
American voice actresses
Crime victim advocates
Deaths from pneumonia in California
Stabbing attacks in the United States
Stabbing survivors
Writers from Brooklyn